Stafstedt is a municipality in the district of Rendsburg-Eckernförde, in Schleswig-Holstein, Germany.

People from Stafstedt 
 Günther Fielmann (born 1939), german businessman

References

Municipalities in Schleswig-Holstein
Rendsburg-Eckernförde